Mitooma, also Mitoma, is a town in the Western Region of Uganda. It is the main municipal, administrative, and commercial center of Mitooma District.

Location
Mitooma Municipal Council is located in Ruhinda County, Mitooma District, Ankole sub-region, in Uganda's Western Region. The geographical coordinates of the town are 0°36'54.0"S, 30°02'42.0"E (Latitude:-0.6150; Longitude:30.0450).

Population
In 2015, Uganda Bureau of Statistics (UBOS) estimated the population of Mitooma Town Council at 5,700. In 2020, the population agency estimated the mid-year population of the town at 6,000 people. Of these, an estimated 3,100 (51.7 percent) were females and 2,900 (48.3 percent) were males. UBOS calculated that the town's population increased at an average rate of 1.03 percent annually, between 2015 and 2020.

Points of interest
The following points of interest li within Mitooma Town Council, on near its borders.

1. The offices of Mitooma Municipal Council

2. The headquarters of Mitooma District Administration

3. Mitooma Central Market

4. The western end of the tarmacked  Kashenyi–Mitooma Road, is located here.

5. The  Mitooma–Rukungiri Road, a heavily pot-holed dirt road starts here to end at Rukungiri, in Rukungiri District.

See also
Ankole sub-region
List of cities and towns in Uganda
Kahinda Otafiire

References

External links
  Why Politicians Fought to Stop Bushenyi Split
 Housing Divides Mitooma Leaders

Populated places in Western Region, Uganda
Mitooma District
Ankole sub-region